Zayzun (also spelled Zaizoun or Zeizoun) is a town in southern Syria, administratively part of the Daraa Governorate, and located northwest of Daraa on the Syrian-Jordanian borders. The village is famous for its waterfalls and other natural sites.

Syrian Railways
Zayzun is the last stop of the secondary route of the Syrian Railways which primarily connect Damascus to Dera'a.

References

Populated places in Daraa District
Villages in Syria